The Roosevelt Island Operating Corporation (RIOC) is a New York State public-benefit corporation responsible for developing Roosevelt Island, a small island in the East River that is part of the New York City borough of Manhattan.

Organization
RIOC is guided by a 5-member board of directors. Its management team is headed by President and CEO Shelton J. Haynes, who reports to the board. In 2017, it had operating expenses of $26.09 million and a level of staffing of 175 people.

History
Roosevelt Island Operating Corporation was created by New York State in 1984 to manage development and operations of Roosevelt Island. Before RIOC there existed other state agencies which ran the island's day-to-day operations such as the Welfare Island Development Corporation and later the Roosevelt Island Development Corporation. The first RIOC Board and President were appointed by the Governor in 1986.

The New York State Urban Development Corporation (UDC) operated New York City’s Welfare Island, as Roosevelt Island was previously known, prior to RIOC. Development of the island was based on the principles of urban "new communities" under President Lyndon Johnson’s "Great Society" programs of the 1960s and early 1970s, and development of the "new" community there was authorized by the 99-year ground lease and accompanying General Development Plan (GDP) agreed upon by New York City and New York State in 1969. The NY State GDP, which has been amended from time to time, provides for the development of housing, shops and community facilities for a mixed-income, handicap-accessible residential neighborhood.

Roosevelt Island requires specialized operations and infrastructure maintenance such as the aerial tramway, an on-island bus system, an underground pneumatic tube garbage collection system, and seawall improvements. Basic services such as MTA stops on the subway (Roosevelt Island station) and bus routes ( bus), as well as water and sewage input and output, are provided by other agencies such as the MTA and the City of New York. Meanwhile, RIOC supplements these services with its own specialized operations, infrastructure, and capital improvements.

Today, the Roosevelt Island Operating Corporation manages a mixed-income community of about 12,000 residents featuring numerous parks and greenspaces, recreational facilities, and six city-designated landmark buildings. The waterfront promenade circling the island provides panoramic views of New York City icons such as the United Nations Headquarters, the Empire State Building, the Chrysler Building, the Queensboro Bridge, and the landmarked Pepsi-Cola sign in Queens.

Transportation

The Roosevelt Island Operating Corporation operates the Roosevelt Island Tram and the Red Bus, which connects the tram to island locations. , the bus service is free.

Routes

Bus roster

AVAC 
RIOC operates the island's high-tech sanitation system, called automated vacuum collection (AVAC). In this system, a computer turns on the trash receptacles in each building every hour, opening a valve that releases garbage into one of two underground pipes. These pipes then suck the garbage into the AVAC complex, where dust and waste are filtered, packaged, and released. When the system was installed, the only other pneumatic garbage system in the US was in Disney World.

Public safety

RIOC operates the Roosevelt Island Public Safety Department (RIPSD), the law-enforcement agency that patrols the island under the 1968 contract between the city and the state. The department protects the island's property including all public/state facilities, storefronts, and certain contracted residential buildings, and enforces state and city laws on the island. It employs approximately 40 officers.

Parks and recreation
RIOC maintains and rents out sports fields around the island for public use. The Sportspark exercise facility at the southern end of Roosevelt Island features a pool, basketball court, and ping-pong room.

See also 
 Hudson River Park Trust
 Hugh L. Carey Battery Park City Authority
 Lower Manhattan Development Corporation
 Municipal Assistance Corporation for the City of NY
 New York Convention Center Operating Corporation
 United Nations Development Corporation

References

External links 
 

 

Public benefit corporations in New York (state)
Roosevelt Island